The National Theatre is a theater located in Sinđelić Square, Niš, Serbia. It was founded in 1887 as "Sinđelić" Theatre, and reorganized in 1906 as National Theatre, following the completion of new theatre building.

External links 

 

Theatres in Niš
Serbian culture
Theatres completed in 1887
1887 establishments in Serbia
Buildings and structures in Niš
Nis, National Theatre in Nis